Schwarzer Berg is a mountain of Saxony, southeastern Germany.

Mountains of Saxony